Volksgrenadier was the name given to a type of German Army division formed in the Autumn of 1944 after the double loss of Army Group Center to the Soviets in Operation Bagration and the Fifth Panzer Army to the Allies in Normandy. The name itself was intended to build morale, appealing at once to nationalism (Volk) and Germany's older military traditions (Grenadier). Germany formed 78 VGDs during the war. Volksgrenadier divisions were professional military formations with standardized weapons and equipment, unlike the unrelated Volkssturm militia.

History and organisation
The strategic emergency and concomitant manpower shortage resulting from the losses in mid-1944 required the creation of infantry divisions that economized on personnel and emphasized defensive strength over offensive strength. The Volksgrenadier divisions met this need by using only six line infantry battalions instead of the normal nine for infantry divisions – already a common reality for many existing divisions. The units also had a higher proportion of submachine guns and light automatic weapons and thus relied more on short-range firepower than in standard German Army infantry units. Automatic weapons like the new Sturmgewehr 44 and anti-tank weaponry like the single shot panzerfaust were also used by Volksgrenadier units. One battalion of one grenadier regiment and the two companies of the engineer battalion were assigned bicycles for transportation instead of motor vehicles.

They were organized around small cadres of hardened veteran soldiers, noncommissioned officers and officers, and then bulked out with anything the Replacement Army could supply: "jobless" personnel of the shrinking Kriegsmarine and Luftwaffe, recovered wounded soldiers from broken formations returning to duty from hospitals, older men who would have been considered too old or too unfit for the peacetime army, and young men and teenagers from the latest conscription classes were all recruited into the ranks.

Organisation

 Division headquarters
 Füsilier company or battalion (bicycle-mounted)
 Company headquarters
 Submachine gun platoon
 Submachine gun platoon
 Rifle platoon
 Heavy weapons platoon
 Infantry howitzer section
 Signal battalion
 Battalion headquarters
 Telephone company
 Radio company
 Supply platoon
 Grenadier regiment
 Regimental headquarters
 Regimental headquarters company
 Infantry battalion
 Infantry battalion
 Infantry howitzer company 
 Antitank rocket launcher company
 Grenadier regiment
 Grenadier regiment
 Artillery regiment
 Regimental headquarters
 Regimental headquarters battery
 75 mm gun battalion
 105 mm gun/howitzer battalion
 105 mm gun/howitzer battalion
 150 mm howitzer battalion
 Antitank battalion
 Battalion headquarters
 Battalion headquarters company 
 Antitank company (motorized)
 Antitank company (self-propelled)
 Antiaircraft company (self-propelled)
 Engineer battalion
 Battalion headquarters company 
 Engineer company (bicycle-mounted)
 Engineer company (bicycle-mounted)
 Supply regiment
 Supply troops
 Ordnance company
 Maintenance platoon
 Administrative troops
 Medical troops
 Veterinary company
 Field post office

Battle
Volksgrenadier divisions participated in battles in eastern France, the defense of the Siegfried Line, Operation Market Garden, Battle of the Scheldt, the Battle of the Bulge, the Battle of Otterlo, the Eastern Front, and in the final battles in Germany itself. Some Volksgrenadier divisions performed well, while others were rushed into battle with a minimum of training. Several Volksgrenadier divisions, especially those made up of "jobless" Wehrmacht personnel drawn from the Kriegsmarine and the Luftwaffe, often displayed high motivation and morale which resulted in good cohesion and military effectiveness against the Allied forces in the last eight or so months (about October 1944 through May 1945) of the war in Europe.

See also 

List of German divisions in World War II

References 

 Nash, Douglas E., Victory Was Beyond Their Grasp: With the 272nd Volks-Grenadier Division from the Hurtgen Forest to the Heart of the Reich. Bedford, PA: Aberjona Press, 2008)

Military units and formations of Germany in World War II
German words and phrases
Volksgrenadier divisions